A Dream of Red Mansions is a Chinese serial feature film produced by Beijing Film Studio, released in 6 parts (8 episodes) between 1988 and 1989. Directed by Xie Tieli (谢铁骊) and Zhao Yuan (赵元), it is a cinematic adaptation of the 18th-century Chinese novel of the same name. The film took two years to prepare and three years to shoot, and remains, at 735 minutes, the longest ever made in the People's Republic of China.

Lead actresses Xia Qin and Tao Huimin were both Yue opera artistes, with Xia Qin taking on the role of the male lead Jia Baoyu. The film won Best Director, Best Supporting Actress (Lin Moyu), Best Act Direction and Best Costume Design at the 10th Golden Rooster Awards.

Cast
Many of the actors were Chinese opera actors: Tao Huimin, Li Yongyong and He Saifei were all professional Yue opera actresses from the Zhejiang Xiaobaihua Yue Opera Troupe; Xing Jinsha (or Ying Kam Sha) was a Kunqu actress; Yuan Mei was a Huangmei opera actress; and Zhao Lirong was a Ping opera actress. Xia Qin, Ji Qilin, Li Lingyu and He Qing had all undergone years of training in Chinese opera.

Xia Qin (夏钦) as Jia Baoyu
Tao Huimin (陶慧敏) as Lin Daiyu
Fu Yiwei as Xue Baochai
Lin Moyu (林默予) as Grandmother Jia
Liu Xiaoqing as Wang Xifeng
Ma Xiaoqing (马晓晴) as Shi Xiangyun
Li Xiuming as Jia Yuanchun
Yang Shihua (杨世华) as Jia Yingchun
Zeng Dan (曾丹) as Jia Tanchun
Ding Lan (丁岚) as Jia Xichun
Zhang Jie (章杰) as Jia Zheng
Wang Guangquan (王光权) (early) and Ji Qilin (later) as Jia Lian
Shi Xian (石冼) as Jia Zhen
Zhou Jieyu (周杰宇) as Jia She
Wang Zhenrong (王振荣) as Jia Jing
Zhang Jian (章健) as Jia Rong
Shan Zenghong (闪增宏) as Jia Rui
Xing Jinsha (邢金莎) (early) and Zhang Lei (张蕾) (later) as Hua Xiren
Li Yongyong (李勇勇) as Qingwen
Xu Jiequn (许杰群) as Yuanyang
Ni Xuehua (倪雪华) as Ping'er
Tong Xin (童欣) as Xiangling
Chen Hong as Zijuan
Zhao Lirong as Granny Liu
Wang Minyi (王敏宜) as Lady Wang
Yuan Mei (袁玫) as Aunt Xue
He Qing (何晴) as Qin Keqing
Xing Hong (邢红) as Li Wan
He Saifei as Miaoyu
Lin Xiaojie (林小解) as Xue Pan
Chen Hong (陈虹) as Second Sister You
Li Lingyu as Third Sister You
Fan Weihua (范卫华) as Xia Jin'gui
Zhang Baoqiu (张葆秋) as Concubine Zhao
Li Fazeng (李法曾) as Jia Yucun

Plot summary

The film adapts the major events and incidents of the novel. The last part (Part Six) is essentially an abridged adaptation of the Cheng-Gao ending.

References

External links

A Dream of Red Mansions, Part 1 at the Chinese Movie Database

1988 films
1989 films
Films based on Chinese novels
Film series based on novels
Chinese film series
Works based on Dream of the Red Chamber